Jakob Andreasen (born 16 January 1976) is a Danish team handball coach. He has been the head coach for Silkeborg-Voel KFUM since 2006.

He formerly coached the Greenlandic women's national team and Greenlandic men's national team.

References

Living people
Danish male handball players
Danish handball coaches
1976 births
People from Silkeborg
Sportspeople from the Central Denmark Region